Peter Hill (born 1957) is an Australian Paralympic swimmer and athlete, who won two silver medals at the 1980 Arnhem Paralympics.

Personal
Hill was born in Brisbane. At the age of 18, a car accident left him a quadriplegic. Before the accident, he was an apprentice plumber and was a sports champion at school.  Five years after the accident, he qualified as  a dental technician. He also designed and built wheelchairs.

Sporting career

At the 1979 National Paraplegic and Quadriplegic Games in Perth Hill won gold medals in athletics events. At the 1980 Arnhem Games, he competed in athletics and swimming events. He won silver medals in the Men's 25 m Backstroke 1C and Men's 25 m Breaststroke 1C events.

In 1980, at the age of 23, he was named Young Australian of the Year.

References

External links
 

1957 births
Living people
Paralympic athletes of Australia
Male Paralympic swimmers of Australia
Paralympic silver medalists for Australia
Paralympic medalists in swimming
Athletes (track and field) at the 1980 Summer Paralympics
Swimmers at the 1980 Summer Paralympics
Medalists at the 1980 Summer Paralympics
Australian male wheelchair racers
People with tetraplegia
Athletes from Brisbane
Swimmers from Brisbane
Australian male backstroke swimmers
Australian male breaststroke swimmers
20th-century Australian people